Ipswich is a city in and county seat of Edmunds County, South Dakota, United States. The population was 928 at the 2020 census.

History
Ipswich was founded in 1883 as a stop on the Chicago, Milwaukee, St. Paul and Pacific Railroad. It was named after Ipswich, in England, perhaps via Ipswich, Massachusetts.

Geography
Ipswich is located at  (45.445009, -99.030239).

Climate

Demographics

2010 census
As of the census of 2010, there were 954 people, 402 households, and 249 families living in the city. The racial makeup of the city was 97.5% White, 0.1% African American, 0.9% Native American, 0.1% Asian, and 1.4% from two or more races. Hispanic or Latino of any race were 0.7% of the population.

There were 402 households, of which 29.6% had children under the age of 18 living with them, 51.7% were married couples living together, 7.5% had a female householder with no husband present, 2.7% had a male householder with no wife present, and 38.1% were non-families. 35.6% of all households were made up of individuals, and 17.9% had someone living alone who was 65 years of age or older. The average household size was 2.24 and the average family size was 2.91.

The median age in the city was 45.1 years. 23.3% of residents were under the age of 18; 6.3% were between the ages of 18 and 24; 20.3% were from 25 to 44; 27.3% were from 45 to 64; and 22.7% were 65 years of age or older. The gender makeup of the city was 49.8% male and 50.2% female.

2000 census
As of the census of 2000, there were 943 people, 404 households, and 254 families living in the city. The population density was 719.3 people per square mile (277.9/km2). There were 440 housing units at an average density of 335.6 per square mile (129.7/km2). The racial makeup of the city was 98.52% White, 0.21% African American, 0.42% Native American, 0.11% Asian, 0.11% Pacific Islander, 0.21% from other races, and 0.42% from two or more races. Hispanic or Latino of any race were 0.64% of the population.

There were 404 households, out of which 29.7% had children under the age of 18 living with them, 54.0% were married couples living together, 7.7% had a female householder with no husband present, and 37.1% were non-families. 34.2% of all households were made up of individuals, and 20.8% had someone living alone who was 65 years of age or older. The average household size was 2.32 and the average family size was 3.01.

In the city, the population was spread out, with 27.4% under the age of 18, 5.3% from 18 to 24, 23.4% from 25 to 44, 19.3% from 45 to 64, and 24.6% who were 65 years of age or older. The median age was 41 years. For every 100 females, there were 92.1 males. For every 100 females age 18 and over, there were 84.1 males.

The median income for a household in the city was $33,073, and the median income for a family was $40,598. Males had a median income of $30,268 versus $16,413 for females. The per capita income for the city was $19,890. About 6.7% of families and 8.7% of the population were below the poverty line, including 6.2% of those under age 18 and 19.2% of those age 65 or over.

Notable people
 Everett Hughes, United States military officer
 J.W. Parmley, South Dakota lawyer, legislator, and businessman

See also
 List of cities in South Dakota

References

External links

Cities in South Dakota
Cities in Edmunds County, South Dakota
County seats in South Dakota
Aberdeen, South Dakota micropolitan area